Palojori is a village in Palojori CD block in the Madhupur subdivision of the Deoghar district in the Indian state of Jharkhand.

Geography

Location

Overview
The map shows a large area, which is a plateau with low hills, except in the eastern portion where the Rajmahal hills intrude into this area and the Ramgarh hills are there.  The south-western portion is just a rolling upland. The entire area is overwhelmingly rural with only small pockets of urbanisation.

Note: The full screen map is interesting. All places marked on the map are linked in the full screen map and one can easily move on to another page of his/her choice. Enlarge the full screen map to see what else is there – one gets railway connections, many more road connections and so on.

Area

Demographics
According to the 2011 Census of India, Palojori had a total population of 2,727, of which 1,396 (51%) were males and 1,331 (49%) were females. Population in the age range 0–6 years was 402. The total number of literate persons in Palojori was 2,325 (74.24% of the population over 6 years).

Civic administration

Police station
There is a police station at Palojori.

CD block HQ
Headquarters of Palojori CD block is at Palojori village.

Education
Kasturba Gandhi Balika Vidyalaya, Palajori, is a Hindi-medium girls only institution established in 2005. It has facilities for teaching from class VI to class XII.

Project Girls High School Palajori is a Hindi-medium coeducational institution established in 1984. It has facilities for teaching for teaching in class IX and class X.

Sunrays High School is a Hindi-medium coeducational institution established at Palajori in 2006. It has facilities for teaching from class VI to class X.

References

Villages in Deoghar district